Ludovic Boulesteix (born 13 July 1973) is a French slalom canoeist who competed in the 1990s. He won a silver medal in the K1 team event at the 1997 ICF Canoe Slalom World Championships in Três Coroas.

World Cup individual podiums

References

French male canoeists
Living people
1973 births
Medalists at the ICF Canoe Slalom World Championships